Mentes can refer to:
 two characters in Greek mythology:
 Mentes (King of the Cicones), as described in the Iliad
 Mentes (King of the Taphians), as described in the Odyssey
 Menteş, Sandıklı, village in Turkey

Mentes is the surname of:
 Mentes József (1925-96), Hungarian actor
 Murat Menteş (d. 1974), Turkish writer
 Yalçın Menteş (b. 1960), Turkish actor

See also
 Mendes (disambiguation)
 Mentos, mints
 "Mientes," Spanish language song by Mexican group Camila 
 Menteşe (disambiguation)